Let's Make Music was a Canadian children's music television series which aired on CBC Television from 1953 to 1954.

Premise
This children's series on music provided education on music appreciation and theory. David Ouchterlony, from The Royal Conservatory of Music, hosted this series and a later radio series of classical music on CFRB Toronto.

Scheduling
This half-hour series was broadcast on Tuesdays at 5:00 p.m. from 27 September to 3 October 1953, then moved to a Wednesday 5:00 p.m. time slot from 21 October 1953 to 25 May 1954.

References

External links
 

CBC Television original programming
1950s Canadian children's television series
1950s Canadian music television series
1953 Canadian television series debuts
1954 Canadian television series endings
Black-and-white Canadian television shows
Television shows filmed in Toronto